USS Enterprise may refer to the following ships and other vessels:

United States Navy

Ships
 List of ships of the United States Navy named Enterprise
 , a Continental Navy sloop captured from the British, burned to prevent recapture in 1777
 , a schooner that fired the first shots in the First Barbary War
 , a schooner, stationed primarily in South America to patrol and protect commerce
 , a steam-powered sloop-of-war used for surveying, patrolling, and training until 1909
 , a motorboat (1917–1919) used in World War I as a non-commissioned section patrol craft
 , an aircraft carrier (1938–1947), the most decorated U.S. ship of World War II
 , the world's first nuclear-powered aircraft carrier (1961–2017)
 , a Gerald R. Ford-class aircraft carrier, under construction and scheduled to enter service by 2028

Training facility
 , a building and ship simulator at the U.S. Navy training command in Great Lakes, Illinois

Other American ships
 , a Continental Navy schooner, formerly a privateer, used in Chesapeake Bay as a convoy and patrol ship until 1777
 , a commercial steamboat that delivered supplies and troops during the Battle of New Orleans
 , a merchant vessel in the coastwise slave trade in the early 19th century
 , a J-class yacht that won the 1930 America's Cup
 , an American cargo ship (1944–1952)
  (2003–2008), former name of TS Kennedy, a training ship at the Massachusetts Maritime Academy

American aircraft and spacecraft 
 , a balloon used by the Union Army during the American Civil War
  (OV-101), the first orbiter built for NASA's Space Shuttle system
 , a NASA conceptual design for an interstellar ship, 
  (2009–2014), a Virgin Galactic commercial spaceplane that broke apart during a test flight

Star Trek fictional spacecraft
 , a list, timeline and brief description of starships in the fictional history of Star Trek
 , the principal setting of Star Trek: Enterprise
 , the principal setting of the original Star Trek television series, Star Trek: Strange New Worlds, and the first three Star Trek feature films
 , the closing setting of the fourth Star Trek feature film and the principal setting of the fifth and sixth Star Trek feature films
 , the opening setting of the seventh Star Trek feature film
 , a starship in "Yesterday's Enterprise", an episode of Star Trek: The Next Generation
 , the principal setting of Star Trek: The Next Generation and the seventh Star Trek feature film
 , the principal setting of the eighth, ninth, and tenth Star Trek feature films
 , first appeared in the Star Trek Online game in 2011 as a non-player flagship. The ship makes an appearance in the third season of the Star Trek: Picard television series.
 , a starship referenced in "Azati Prime", an episode of Star Trek: Enterprise
 , a starship replica of NCC-1701, designated a museum ship, in the video mini-series Star Trek: Of Gods and Men (non-canon)

See also
 Enterprise (disambiguation)
 , a list of ships of the British Royal Navy